The 2019–20 Denver Pioneers men's ice hockey season was the 71st season of play for the program and the 7th in the NCHC conference. The Pioneers represented the University of Denver and were coached by David Carle, in his second season.

On March 12, 2020, NCHC announced that the tournament was cancelled due to the coronavirus pandemic, before any games were played.

Roster

As of June 28, 2019.

Standings

Schedule and Results

|-
!colspan=12 style="color:white; background:#862633; " | Regular Season

|-
!colspan=12 style="color:white; background:#862633; " | 
|- align="center" bgcolor="#e0e0e0"
|colspan=12|Tournament Cancelled

Scoring Statistics

Goaltending statistics

Rankings

Players drafted into the NHL

2020 NHL Entry Draft

† incoming freshman

References

Denver Pioneers men's ice hockey seasons
Denver Pioneers 
Denver Pioneers 
Denver Pioneers 
Denver Pioneers